"Sunrise" is a song by British rock band Pulp, from their 2001 album We Love Life. It was released as a double-A single with "The Trees" on 8 October 2001 ahead of the album, charting at #23 in the UK Singles Chart. "Sunrise" is also used in the award-winning BBC animated satirical comedy sketch show Monkey Dust.

Background
"Sunrise" was one of the first songs written for We Love Life and was debuted at the 2000 Reading Festival. Cocker explained of the song's meaning:

Release
"Sunrise" was the favorite of the band to be We Love Life's first single, due to its having a "life of its own" and "a real vibe," according to Island Records' Nigel Coxon. In the end, the song was released as a double-A side with "The Trees" at the insistence of the record company. Coxon explained, Sunrise' seemed to have a momentum of its own, but no one in the record company... got it. We all thought it was brilliant and it should be a single... but the record company, being very timid possibly, thought, 'Sunrise', six minutes, two-minute outro, no chance." As a compromise, the two songs were released as a double-A side, which meant, according to Coxon, that "that single got slightly diluted". The single reached number 23 in the UK, a relative disappointment for the band.

The Fat Truckers remix of "Sunrise" is notable for removing the instrumentation from the original recording and using loops and quick-cuts of Jarvis Cocker sighing and breathing heavily to replace it.

Track listings

References

Pulp (band) songs
2001 singles
Songs written by Jarvis Cocker
Songs written by Nick Banks
Songs written by Candida Doyle
Songs written by Steve Mackey
Songs written by Mark Webber (guitarist)
2001 songs